Ven. Thich Nhat Tu or Thích Nhật Từ (釋日慈) in Vietnamese (Saigon, 1969) is a Vietnamese Buddhist reformer, an author, a poet, a psychological consultant, and an active social activist in Vietnam. He is committed to propagate Buddha's teachings through education, cultural activities and charitable programs in order to benefit the individuals and the society at large.

Biography
Ven. Thich Nhat Tu was born in 1969. After completing secondary high school, he became a novice at 13 years old, under the spiritual guidance of the late Most Ven. Thich Thien Hue at Giac Ngo Temple and received full ordination in 1988. He has been the Abbot of Giac Ngo Temple since 1992, and is the founder of Buddhism Today Foundation in 2000. He is also the Abbot of Huong Son temple (Ha Tinh), Quan Am Dong Hai temple (Soc Trang), and Giac Ngo temple (Ba Ria - Vung Tau).

In 1992 he went to India for higher education and got his MA degree in philosophy in 1997 from Delhi University and D.Phil. degree from Allahabad University in 2001, respectively.

Ven. Thich Nhat Tu has authored more than seventy books in Vietnamese and English on Buddhist philosophy and applied Buddhism. He is editor-in-chief and publisher of Buddhism Today Books Series (more than 200 volumes on different subjects have been published in Vietnamese to meet the needs of researchers and practitioners). He is also author and editor of Buddhism Today Dharma Talks Series (more than 2000 VCDs and audio CDs on Buddhamdharma as taught by Ven. Dr. Thich Nhat Tu have been produced by the Buddhism Today Association for the general public). He is editor and publisher of Buddhism Today Dharma Music Series (more than 100 CD albums have been published).

He is also editor and publisher of the Vietnamese Tripitaka in MP3 format (The recording of the Vietnamese Sutta Pitaka translated from the Pali by Thich Minh Chau and that of the Mahayana tradition translated from the Chinese by various Mahayana scholars, the Āgamas, and Vinaya Pitaka. The Abhidharma is being carried out. The first mp3 edition of Sutta Pitaka came into existence in May 2006 for celebrations of Buddha Jayanti and has been placed on one of its websites, for downloading to both Macintosh and Windows computers. It is available for free distribution and non-commercial purposes.

Since 2002, he has extensively given public Dharma talks to Vietnamese communities, domestically as well as internationally, such as America, Australia and Europe. He is organizer and moderator of A Fortnightly Retreat for about 1500 practitioners at Pho Quang Temple, HCMC.

He is also actively engaged in the inter-religious dialogue and promotion of peace and harmony. He is committed to propagate Buddhist teachings through education, cultural activities and charitable programs in order to benefit the society at large.

Ven. Dr. Thich Nhat Tu currently serves as Standing Vice Rector of the Vietnam Buddhist University in Ho Chi Minh city, Standing Vice Chair of the National Department of International Buddhist Affairs (National Vietnam Buddhist Sangha), Vice Rector of Vietnam Buddhist Research Institute, and General Editor of Vietnamese Buddhist Tripitaka and Editor-in-chief of Buddhism Today magazine.

Education and conference
In spite of being born in the period when the country was still in difficulties with after war consequences, all Buddhist schools were forced to close, he was fortunate enough to be trained under respected Buddhist leaders in Vietnam in the 20th century, namely Thich Minh Chau, Thich Thien Sieu, Thich Duc Nghiep, etc... Thanks to their teachings and training, when still a Samanera, he was already rich in knowledge of Theravada and Mahayana sutras. He got a Bachelor of Arts in English in 1994, University of Pedagogy; Master of Philosophy in 1997, Delhi University; Doctor of Philosophy in 2001, Allahabad University.

Thich Nhat Tu has attended and contributed papers at international Buddhist conferences such as the International Conclave on Buddhism and Spiritual Tourism (New Delhi), Fo Guang Shan International Monastic Seminar (Kaohsiung), the Fourth World Buddhist Summit (Bangkok), Dharma Drum Mountain World Center for Buddhist Education Conference (Taipei), the First World Buddhist Forum (Hangzhou), the 23rd General Conference of the World Fellowship of Buddhists (Kaohsiung), the First International Buddhist Conference (Kandy), International Buddhist Conference during United Nations day of Vesak (Thailand, 2007–2013), the Asian Zen Conference (international seminar on Meditation and Zen, Hong Kong), International Conference on Dharma – Dhamma (Sanchi/ Bhopal, India), National Conference on Buddhist Education (Hanoi), the International Conference on Buddhism in the New Era (HCM), International Conference on Multi-ethnic and Multi-language Asia, and others (HCM), etc.

He was international conference coordinator of United Nations Day of Vesak conference 2008 and 2014. He was convenor of several national conference on philosophy and Buddhism co-organised by Vietnam Buddhist University, Vietnam Buddhist Research Institute and HCM University of Humanities and Social Sciences.

He has been appointed as the International Organising Committee member of the UN Day of Vesak Celebration 2006–2012 and vice chair, international secretariat of the UN Day of Vesak Celebration 2007, Bangkok, general secretary of UNDV in 2008 and again deputy general secretary of UNDV 2014 and 2019.

Honorary doctorates
In appreciation of his excellent contribution to Buddhist education, his works on Buddhist academic research and leadership in international Buddhist community, several universities have conferred upon him Honorary Doctorates as follows:
 2010: Honorary Doctor of Philosophy in Religious Studies, conferred by the Mahamakut Buddhist University, Bangkok, Thailand on October 30, 2010;
 2016: Honorary Degree of Doctor in Philosophy, conferred by the Mahachulalongkornrajavidyalaya University, Bangkok, Thailand, on May 15, 2016.
 2016: Honorary Degree of Doctor Letters, conferred by Apollos University, USA, on Jun 20, 2016.
 2019: Honorary Doctor of Letters conferred by Chancellor of Swami Vivekanand Subhrati University, Meerut, India, on April 27, 2019.
 2019: Doctor of Philosophy in Humanity Honoris Causa conferred by Rector of Preah Sihanouk Raja Buddhist University, Phnom Penh, Cambodia, on March 31, 2019.
 2021: Honorary Doctoral of Philosophy in Morality Education conferred by President of International University of Morality, USA on Oct 14, 2021.
 2022: Honorary Doctor Degree of Literature (Sahithya Chakrawarthi) conferred by Chancellor of Buddhist and Pali University of Sri Lanka, on April 6, 2022; Ref. BPU/ASS-04/Con.12/2021.

International Awards and Recognitions
 2013:  African Award for Leadership Excellence conferred by Chairman of the board of Buddhist Federation of African, on October 13, 2013.
 2015:  Saddhammajotikadhaja Title conferred by Government of Myanmar, Yangon, Myanmar, on March 4, 2015.
 2015:  The World Buddhist Outstanding Leader Award conferred by Acting Supreme Patriarch of Thailand, President of the Supreme Sangha Council, Bangkok, Thailand, on March 5, 2015.
 2017:  Global Buddhist Reformer Award conferred by President of World Alliance of Buddhist Leaders, Malaysia, July 22, 2017. 
 2017:  Global Buddhist Ambassador Award conferred by H.E. Loknayak Ashva Ghosh Mahanayaka, Chairman of Manak International Institute of Buddhist Studies, Bangkok, February 12, 2017. 
 2018:  Global Mentor Award conferred by Chancellor of Swami Vivekanand Subhrati University, Meerut, India, July 30, 2018.
 2019:  International Research and Education Award conferred by President of Asian Association for the Study of Culture and Religion of, March 31, 2019.
 2019:  International education Award conferred by President of Nepal Traditional Buddhist Association, Lumbini, February 28, 2019.
 2019:  Saddharma Keerthi Sri Darshana Visharada Award conferred by Sangharaja of Parama Dhamma Chetiya Pirivena Ratmalana, Colombo, Sri Lanka, July 16, 2019
 2019:  Suvanna Pathom Chedi Award given by National Office of Buddhism, Thailand conferred by Somdej Phra Ariyavongsagatanana, Sangharaja, Supreme Patriarch of Thailand, August 4, 2019
 2019:  Outstanding Educator Award conferred by Founder of International Buddhist College, Thailand, on September 7, 2019.
 2019:  Atisha Dipankar Peace Gold Award conferred by HH. Sanghanayaka Suddhananda, Sangharaja of Bangladesh Bouddha Kristi Prachar Sangha, October 21, 2019
 2019:  The Award for Patronaging and Supporting Buddhism conferred by Somdej Phra Ariyavongsagatanana, Sangharaja, Supreme Patriarch of Thailand, July 16, 2019.
 2019:  Global Mahasaddhamjotika Award conferred by President of Younker Historical Research Foundation, March 7, 2019.
 2021:  Vaishakh Samman Prashastri Patra Award (Vesak Citation of Honour) conferred by Ministry of Culture Government of India, Bodhgaya, May 26, 2021.
 2021:  The Symbol of Peace Award conferred by Pallavi T, President of the Neeraja Universal Peace Foundation, India, September 21, 2021.
 2021:  Global Messenger of Peace Award conferred by 
 2021:  The Symbol of Peace Award conferred by Kepeel Barsaiyan, President of Buddh Jyoti Foundation, India, September 21, 2021.
 2021:  Social Change and World Peace Award by Bhikkhu Pragyadeep, General Secretary of All India Bhikkhu Sangha, Bihar, India, September 30, 2021.
 2021:  Outstanding Contribution to Education Award by Acharya Norbu Sherpa, President of Nepal Buddhist Federation, September 20, 2021.
 2021:  Dr. Sarvepalli Radhakrishnan Best Faculty Award 2021 conferred by Dr.Ratnakar D. Bala, President of Center for Professional Advancement Continuous Education - CPACE, India, September 5, 2021.
 2021:  Exemplary Covid-19 Social Work Award conferred by Bhikkhu Vinaybodhi, President, Mumbai Pradesh Bhikkhu Sangha, India, September 30, 2021.
 2021:  Best Leadership Award conferred by Chandrabhan Patil, President of The Buddhist Society of India, India, September 30, 2021.
 2021:  The Award for Mindful Educator conferred by Sulekhatai Kumbhare, President of Ogawa Society, September 30, 2021.
 2021:  World Teacher’s Day Award conferred by Prof.Ratnakar, Director of IMRF Institute of Higher Education & Research, October 5, 2021.

Vietnamese Government Awards and Recognitions
 2008:  Vietnamese Prime Minister’s Award conferred by Prime Minister Nguyen Tan Dung.
 2014:  Vietnam Union of UNESCO Associations Award conferred by President of Vietnam Union of UNESCO Associations.
 2015:  Award of the Vietnam Fatherland Front Committee of HCM City conferred by President of Vietnam Fatherland Front Committee of HCM Cityon January 19, 2015 
 2016:  HCM City People’s Committee Award conferred by President Nguyễn Thành Phong on November 3, 2016 .
 2016:  Award of the Vietnam Fatherland Front Committee of Tien Giang Province conferred by President of Vietnam Fatherland Front Committee of Tien Giang Provinceon January 12, 2016 .
 2017:  Vietnamese Prime Minister’s Award for Serving Buddhism and Nation conferred by Prime Minister Nguyễn Xuân Phúc on November 20, 2017 .
 2017:  Award of the Central Committee of the Vietnam Fatherland Front conferred by President on September 12, 2017 .
 2017:  Award of the Vietnam Fatherland Front Committee of HCM City conferred by President on February 20, 2017 .
 2017:  Award of the Vietnam Fatherland Front Committee of Tien Giang Province conferred by President on March 7, 2017 .
 2018:  Award of the People's Committee of District 10 conferred by President on November 20, 2018 .
 2018:  Award of the People's Committee of District 10 conferred by President on January 5, 2018 .
 2018:  Certificate of Merit from the Director of Blood Transfusion Hospital conferred by Director on November 26, 2018.
 2018:  Certificate of Merits for Good People – Good Deeds 2018 conferred by President on November 14, 2018 .
 2019:  Vietnamese Prime Minister’s Award for Excellent Education conferred by Prime Minister Nguyễn Xuân Phúc on September 17, 2019 .
 2019:  Vietnamese Prime Minister’s Award conferred by Prime Minister Nguyễn Xuân Phúc on November 11, 2019 .
 2019:  Minister of Health Award conferred by Health Minister Nguyễn Thị Kim Tiến on January 17, 2019 .
 2020:  Award of the Vietnam Fatherland Front Committee of HCM City conferred by President Tô Thị Bích Châu on July 1, 2020 
 2021:  Award of the Vietnam Fatherland Front Committee of Dong Nai Province conferred by President of Vietnam Fatherland Front Committee of Dong Nai Province on Sep 8, 2021.
 2021:  Award of the Vietnam Fatherland Front Committee of HCM City conferred by President Tô Thị Bích Châu on Sep 10, 2020.

National Vietnam Buddhist Sangha Awards
2003, 2004, 2005, 2006: HCMC Buddhist Sangha's Merit Award.
2007: HCMC Buddhist Sangha's Outstanding Award, term of office 2002-2007
2008: National Vietnam Buddhist Sangha's Outstanding Merit Award
2009, 2010, 2011, 2012:  HCMC Buddhist Sangha's Merit Award
2012: HCMC Buddhist Sangha's Outstanding Merit Award, term of office 2007-2012
2012: Vietnam Buddhist University's Award
2013: HCMC Buddhist Sangha's Merit Award for Buddhist Education
2013: Vietnam Guinness Record “The best Editor and publisher of Buddhist books”
2014: Vietnam Buddhist Research Institute's Outstanding Merit Award for Buddhist Education
2014: HCMC Buddhist Sangha's Merit Award for Buddhist Culture Promotion
2014: National Vietnam Buddhist Sangha's Outstanding Merit Award.
2016: HCMC Buddhist Sangha's Merit Award for Buddhist Culture Promotion.
2017: Vietnam Buddhist Research Institute's Outstanding Merit Award for Buddhist Research.
2017: National Vietnam Buddhist Sangha's Outstanding Merit Award for Buddhist Publication.
2017: National Vietnam Buddhist Sangha's Outstanding Merit Award for International Buddhist Affairs.
2017: HCMC Buddhist Sangha's Merit Award for Buddhist Culture Promotion.
2017: National Vietnam Buddhist Sangha's Outstanding Merit Award for Buddhist Education.
2017: National Vietnam Buddhist Sangha's Outstanding Merit Award for Dharma Propagation.

Promotion of the Buddhist culture
Since 2002, Thich Nhat Tu set up a Buddhist Music Club in Ho Chi Minh city, with the participation of many famous songwriters, singers and actors to propagate the Buddhist philosophy and practice for general public. He is the editor and publisher of more than 150 CD, VCD, DVD of Buddhist music since 2002.

Being a secretary general of Cultural Department, HCMC Buddhist Sangha (2002–2007) and chairman of the Cultural Department of HCMC Buddhist Sangha (since 2012), every year he organises many Buddhist cultural performances at Lan Anh theatre and Hoa Binh theatre. On top of that, many Buddhist exhibitions, calligraphy, and arts have been organised by him too.

He wrote Follow the Footsteps of the Buddha in India and Nepal, a book that bought the inspiration for the VTC1 Television to accompany him to India to make documentary film about Buddhist pilgrimage in India and Nepal.

Charity for the poor and jail inmates
He is an active social activist and charity fundraiser to help the poor, the old, children, homeless and those suffered from natural disasters, etc... He formed Buddhism Today Charity Group in 2000 to sponsor hundreds of eyes operation a year, donating to Social Support Centers, Retirement Houses, Orphanage Houses, Youth Education Centers, and cancer patients in many hospitals in Vietnam.

He has conducted meditation retreats for thousands of inmates in several rehabilitation facilities and correctional facilities in South Vietnam, such as Tan Hiep (1200 inmates), Chanh Phu Hoa (1000 inmates), Phu Nghia (400 inmates) and Ba Ria Vung Tau (800 inmates).

On February 5 and April 23, 2007, a total of 1850 “long-term” inmates of K.20 Prison, a security jail in Ben Tre Province, and on May 1, 2010, a total of 5500 inmates of Son Phu 4, Thai Nguyen city, under his guidance, have observed vegetarianism and mindfulness practice as a path to inner freedom.

The Buddhist Youth Club
He took part in the foundation of The Buddhist Youth Club in 2006. He promoted the youth activities in South Vietnam in 2010 in which there were 4,000 young Buddhists from 24 cities and provinces to participate in the Buddhist Summer Camp in Dai Nam Theme Park, Binh Duong Province.

Nowadays his model of Buddhist Youth Club has been applied by many provincial Buddhist Sanghas to propagate Buddhism and organise retreats for lay followers, as well as giving exam consultation every year.,

The Dhamma Door
In hundreds of his Dharma talks, Ven. Thich Nhat Tu urges monks, nuns, and lay people to practice the original teachings of the Buddha, in which The Four Noble Truths (sufferings, origin of sufferings, cessation of sufferings, and path leading to cessation of sufferings) and The Noble Eightfold Path are the central doctrine of all Buddhist traditions, a conceptual framework for all of Buddhist thoughts,  instead of being influenced by the Chinese Buddhism.

According to Ven Thich Nhat Tu, there is no such of 84,000 Dharma doors as stated by Chinese schools. In original Buddhism, there is no second Dharma door except threefold learning Discipline, Meditation, and Wisdom. Chinese Dharmas only focus on a few sutras, and tend to ignore all other teachings of the Buddha, as a consequence it is not comprehensive enough to help people cure sufferings completely. To him, 10 Dhamma Doors of China, 14 Dhamma Doors of Japan, and 4 of Tibet are only two parts of The Noble Eightfold Paths which are Right Mindfulness and Right Concentration. Dharma doors propagators have ignored Right View, Right Thought, Right Speech, Right Action, Right Livelihood, and Right Effort. That is why none of the Dharma Doors is comprehensive.

He urges Vietnamese Buddhist monks, nuns and lay followers to come back to the traditional Buddhism, maintain and propagate Vietnamese Buddhist culture in Vietnam, not to let it be influenced by Chinese traditions which have rooted in Vietnam in the past 2,000 years. He calls for a traditional Vietnamese chanting and writing. In Vietnam, all should be chanted and written in Vietnamese language so that everyone understands and follows the Buddha's teaching appropriately, as the full transition of Chinese tradition has deteriorated the initiatives and growth of Vietnamese Buddhism.

United Nations Day of Vesak 2008 and 2014 in Vietnam
The greatest contribution of Ven. Thich Nhat Tu to the public relation of Vietnam Buddhist Sangha is successfully calling for the celebration of UN Day of Vesak (UNDV) (United Nations Day of Vesak) 2008 and 2014 in Vietnam. As the deputy secretary of International Organising Committee (IOC) of United Nations Day of Vesak in Bangkok, he drafted the charter of UNDV, and introduced Le Manh That to IOC of UNDV. As a result, in late 2007, Le Manh That was appointed by IOC as chairman and Ven. Thich Nhat Tu as secretary general of UNDV in 2008, hosted by the Government of Vietnam at National Conference Center, Hanoi, Vietnam.

UNDV 2008 has attracted 550 Buddhist leaders and representatives from 78 countries to attend, while UNDV 2014 attended by 1100 international participants from 95 countries. In 2008, it was one of the 10 biggest events of the country, also a historical record in Vietnam.

UNDV in 2008 and 2014 proved an amazing spectacle of religious and spiritual festivity, with thousands of Buddhists from the world to spread Buddha's message of peace, love and harmony.

He successfully called for the celebration of World Buddhist Summit in Vietnam in 2010, in the Millennial Anniversary of Hanoi. Unfortunately, it was cancelled due to conflicted views between VN Buddhist Sangha and World Buddhist Summit Organisation. It is believed that Thich Nhat Tu is of Vietnamese Monks who has been able to being a bridge between National Vietnam Buddhist Sangha and international Sanghas. Thanks to that VN Buddhist Sangha has gained its reputation internationally.

Thích Nhật Từ's Positions 2022-2027
 Standing member of Vietnam Buddhist Sangha's Executive Council, and Standing Vice Chairman of International Buddhist Affairs Vietnam Buddhist Sangha
 Standing Vice Rector of Vietnam Buddhist University, HCM city
 Vice Director of Vietnam Buddhist Search Institute, and General Editor of Vietnamese Tripitaka Translation project 
 Vice Chairman of National Department of Buddhist Education
 Vice Chairman of Vietnam Buddhist Sangha of HCM City, and Chairman of Department of International Buddhist Affairs

Buddhist books by Thích Nhật Từ

I. English books
 Buddhist Soteriological Ethics: A Study of the Buddha’s Central Teachings. Sai Gon: Oriental Press, 2011.
 Inner Freedom: A Spiritual Journey for Jail Inmates. Hanoi: News Agency Press, 2008, 2011, 2014.
 Engaged Buddhism, Social Change and World Peace. Hanoi: Religion Press, 2014.
 United Nations Day of Vesak 2008. Hanoi: Religion Press, 2014.
 Buddhist Art: An Exhibition Celebrating UN Vesak 2014. Hanoi: Religion Press, 2014.

II. Books on applied Buddhism
 Pure Land Paradise: An Analysis of Amitabha Sutra.  Saigon: The Oriental Press, 2009. p. 142.
 Life after Death.  Saigon: Sai Gon Culture Press, 2010. p. 126.
 A Guide for Writing Research Paper.  Saigon: HCM Publishing House, 2003. p. 200.
 Understanding the Sutra of Forty-two Chapters.  Sai Gon: New Age Press, 2010. p. 499.
 Letting go for Freedom.  Saigon: The Oriental Press, 2010. p. 87.
 Transformation of Emotion.  Saigon: New Age Press, 2010. p. 112.
 Understanding, Love and Sympathy.  Saigon: New Age Press, 2010. p. 174.
 Global Financial Crisis from a Buddhist Point of View.  Saigon: Hai Phong Press, 2009. p. 152.
 No Enemy: A Buddhist Approach to Peace.  Saigon: New Age Press, 2010. p. 121.
 Transformation of Anger.  Saigon: The Oriental Press, 2010. p. 180.
 Facing the Death.  Saigon: New Age Press, 2010. p. 169.
 Turning Your Head, There Is a Shore.  Saigon: The Oriental Press, 2010. p. 202.
 Happiness in Daily Life.  Saigon: The Oriental Press, 2010. p. 194.
 A Peaceful Path.  Saigon: The Oriental Press, 2010. p. 168.
 Happiness in Your Palms.  Saigon: The Oriental Press, 2010. p. 149.
 A Pair of Sleeper: A Buddhist Approach to Happy Marriage.  Saigon: The Oriental Press, 2010. p. 178.
 Buddhism in Modern Era.  Saigon: The Oriental Press, 2011. p. 171.
 Happiness for the Elderly.  Saigon: The Oriental Press, 2011. p. 130.
 A Healthy and Happy Life.  Saigon: The Oriental Press, 2012. p. 124.
 Ten Important Things to be remembered.  Hanoi: Hong Duc Press, 2012. p. 128.
 14 Golden Teachings of the Buddha.  Hanoi: Hong Duc Press, 2012. p. 117.
 The Path to Transformation: Application of the Eightfold Path in Daily Life.  Hanoi: Hong Duc Press, 2012. p. 208.
 The Sutra on the Eight Realizations of the Great Beings: A Practical Approach.  Hanoi: Hong Duc Press, 2012. p. 194.
 Essence of Wisdom: A Practical Interpretation of the Heart Sutra.  Saigon: The Oriental Press, 2012. p. 266.
 Buddhist Thought Magazine,  editor. Saigon: 1991

III. Buddhist chanting books translated by Thich Nhat Tu
 Buddhist Daily Chanting Book.   Hanoi: Religion Press, 1994, 2005, p. 992.
 'Buddhist Ritual Book.  Saigon: The Oriental Press, 2011, p. 390.
 Kṣitigarbha Sutra.  Hanoi: Religion Press, 2008, p. 154.
 Sutra on the last teachings of the Buddha.  Hanoi: Religion Press, 2009, p. 62.
 Collection of Buddhist Mantras.  Hanoi: Religion Press, 2010. p. 30.
 Gratitude to Parents Chanting Book.  Hanoi: Religion Press, 2006. p. 62.
 Buddha Jayanti Chanting Book.  Hanoi: Religion Press, 2006. p. 48.
 Buddhist Repentance Book.  Hanoi: Religion Press, 2002. p. 52.
 Sutra on Amitabha Buddha.  Hanoi: Religion Press, 2003.
 Buddhist Prayer for the Death.  Hanoi: Religion Press, 2005. p. 68.
 Buddhist Prayer for the Disease.  Hanoi: Religion Press, 2005. p. 40.
 Vesak Chanting Book.  Hanoi: Religion Press, 2006.
 Metta Sutta and Mangala Sutta.  Hanoi: Religion Press, 2009. p. 42.
 Buddhist Sutras for Beginners.  Hanoi: Hong Duc Publisher, 2013. p. 124.
 Buddhist Sutras for the Laity. '' Hanoi: Religion Press, 2013. p. 980.

Vietnamese Buddhist Music composed by Thich Nhat Tu
PHẦN I: NHẠC CHỦ ĐỀ (213 bài)
I. NHẠC “CUỘC ĐỜI ĐỨC PHẬT”
1.	Cuộc đời đức Phật 
2.	Cuộc đời đức Phật Thích-ca
3.	Tất-đạt-đa đản sanh
4.	Mừng Phật đản sanh 
5.	Mừng Phật Thích-ca chào đời 
6.	Mừng Phật vào đời. Thể loại: Chèo. Làn điệu: Dương Xuân. Soạn lời: Thích Nhật Từ
7.	Chuyện Phật Thích-ca giáng trần. Thể loại: Lý Dạ cổ hoài Lang. Soạn lời: Thích Nhật Từ
8.	Đức Phật Thích-ca. Thể loại: Chèo cổ. Làn điệu: Luyện năm cung. Soạn lời: Thích Nhật Từ
9.	Đi tìm chân lý cứu muôn loài
10.	Tất-đạt-đa xuất gia
11.	Khúc ca thành đạo 
12.	Mừng Phật thành đạo
13.	Ba tuệ giác của Phật 
14.	Đức Phật chuyển pháp luân
15.	Phật chuyển pháp luân độ đời
16.	Tình thương của Phật
17.	Tâm Phật vô biên 
18.	Đức Phật cứu nhân loại
19.	Con nương tựa Phật 
20.	Con theo chân lý Phật
21.	Chân lý Phật 
22.	Trí tuệ của Phật
23.	Tưởng niệm đức Phật niết-bàn

II. NHẠC “THEO DẤU CHÂN PHẬT”
Theo dấu chân Phật của người tại gia
1.	Có Phật trong con 
2.	Con đường của Phật 
3.	Con gặp Phật qua các hóa thân
4.	Con là Phật tử Việt Nam
5.	Con theo Phật
6.	Con tìm Phật và gặp Phật 
7.	Được Phật dẫn đường soi sáng
8.	Nương tựa Phật Pháp Tăng
9.	Ơn Phật thương con 
10.	Phật dìu dắt đời con 
11.	Phật pháp soi sáng đời con
12.	Phúc cho con gặp Phật
13.	Tạ ơn Phật cho con gặp đạo vàng
14.	Tôi đi tìm tôi 
15.	Tôi gặp Phật trong ba chìm bảy nổi
16.	Vì Phật thương con
Theo dấu chân Phật của người xuất gia
17.	Chú tiểu hồn nhiên 
18.	Con theo Phật cứu đời 
19.	Dâng y cúng dường 
20.	Dâng y Kathina 
21.	Đạo Phật
22.	Noi gương thầy 
23.	Ơn Phật đã chọn con 
24.	Ơn thiêng cao ngất 
25.	Sống đạo giữa đời thường 
26.	Theo dấu chân Phật 
27.	Vì sao theo Phật
28.	Xin Phật cho con
29.	Xuống tóc xuất gia

III. NHẠC LỄ NIỆM PHẬT 
1.	Nhạc đảnh lễ Phật Thích-ca (nhạc lễ)
2.	Nhạc niệm Bồ-tát Quan Âm (nhạc lễ)
3.	Nhạc niệm Bồ-tát Quan Âm bằng Sanskrit (nhạc lễ)
4.	Nhạc niệm Phật A-di-đà (nhạc lễ)
5.	Nhạc niệm Phật Thích-ca (nhạc lễ)
6.	Quy y Phật Pháp Tăng (nhạc lễ)

IV. NHẠC “BỒ-TÁT QUAN ÂM”
1.	Bồ-tát lắng nghe cứu khổ
2.	Bồ-tát Quan Âm từ bi
3.	Bồ-tát Quan Thế Âm
4.	Bồ-tát từ bi
5.	Hạnh nguyện Quan Âm
6.	Học hạnh Quan Âm
7.	Mẹ từ bi thắp sáng đời con
8.	Năng lượng Quan Âm
9.	Noi gương Bồ-tát Quan Âm
10.	Quan Âm ngàn mắt ngàn tay
11.	Tình thương Bồ-tát

V. NHẠC “THIỀN”
1.	Ngồi thiền, thở bốn thì 
2.	Hơi thở chánh niệm 
3.	Thở thiền 
4.	Giả từ quá khứ 
5.	Đừng rượt đuổi tương lai 
6.	Phút giây hiện tại 
7.	Tiếng chuông chánh niệm 
8.	Thiền quán về thân 
9.	Thiền quán về cảm giác 
10.	Thiền quán về tâm 
11.	Thiền quán về các pháp
12.	Thản nhiên trước tám ngọn gió đời 
13.	Thiền quán về vô thường
14.	Tâm vô sở trụ 
15.	Thấy núi sông vẫn là núi sông

VI. NHẠC “TRIẾT LÝ SỐNG”
1.	Cõi đời
2.	Cười nhiều, hạnh phúc nhiều
3.	Đạo Phật Ngày Nay phụng sự nhân sinh
4.	Đừng cải lộn
5.	Đừng tin người hứa lèo
6.	Đừng trách đời nhạt phai
7.	Đừng vì tiền
8.	Ghen
9.	Giả từ Covid-19 
10.	Giả từ mê tín
11.	Giữa chốn hồng trần 
12.	Hạnh phúc giữa đời thường
13.	Hãy cười lên nào
14.	Hiểu và thương
15.	Huynh đệ đàn ông
16.	Khóc cười sự đời
17.	Khổ vui do tâm
18.	Làm người
19.	Làm người tử tế
20.	Lật mặt cuộc đời
21.	Mọi thứ do nhân quả
22.	Một mình tôi chẳng là gì
23.	Mục đích và lý tưởng
24.	Nhận sai, sửa sai
25.	Nói hay im lặng
26.	Núi cao lại có núi cao hơn
27.	Quay đầu vào bờ
28.	Quy luật muôn đời
29.	Sống chân thành
30.	Sống đời vô ngã 
31.	Tái sanh
32.	Thản nhiên trước tám ngọn gió đời 
33.	Thành tâm sám hối
34.	 Thói đời chua cay
35.	Tôi xin nguyện
36.	Trong kiếp luân hồi
37.	Tu là cải thiện chính mình
38.	Tuổi già hạnh phúc
39.	Tuổi già tâm không già
40.	Việt Nam: World Cup 22
41.	Xin đừng
42.	Xin đừng oán trách
43.	Xin đừng than vãn
44.	Xin lỗi

VII. NHẠC QUÊ HƯƠNG 
1.	Chùa làng tôi
2.	Đời anh lính chiến
3.	Đời trai vì gia đình và quê hương
4.	Đời trai vì tương lai
5.	Dòng máu Việt Nam
6.	Gặp Phật trên quê hương
7.	Không nơi nào bằng quê hương
8.	Lên chùa tu học. Thể loại: Dân ca Thanh Hóa. Điệu: Đi cấy. Soạn lời: Thích Nhật Từ. 
9.	Ngôi chùa thân yêu
10.	Người Việt thương người Việt
11.	Non nước Ninh Bình. Lời: Thích Nhật Từ 
12.	Quê hương hai tiếng thiêng liêng
13.	Vào chùa. Thể loại: Dân ca Quan họ Bắc Ninh. Soạn lời: Thích Nhật Từ. 
14.	Vì tổ quốc Việt Nam thiêng liêng
15.	Việt Nam chào đón ta về
16.	Việt Nam đất nước tôi
17.	Việt Nam độc lập tự do
18.	Việt Nam hào hùng
19.	Việt Nam hùng cường
20.	Việt Nam in dấu năm châu
21.	Việt Nam non nước hữu tình 
22.	Xin hỏi anh vì sao?

VIII. NHẠC CÔNG CHA, NGHĨA MẸ, ƠN THẦY
Tình mẹ
1.	Hoa hồng dâng mẹ
2.	Hồi tưởng về mẹ
3.	Lòng mẹ bao la
4.	Mẹ của con
5.	Mẹ là tất cả đời con
6.	Mẹ mãi bên con
7.	Mẹ sống cao cả để con thành người
8.	Mẹ thật tuyệt vời
9.	Nhớ lời mẹ ru
10.	Thương như con ruột
Công cha
1.	Cha hiền
2.	Cha tôi gà trống nuôi con
3.	Cha tôi hôm qua và hôm nay
4.	Mừng sinh nhật cha
5.	Nhớ lời cha dạy
Ơn thầy
1. Ơn thầy khai sáng

IX. NHẠC XUÂN
1.	Chúc mừng năm mới
2.	Hành hương đầu xuân
3.	Khúc ca xuân về
4.	Mừng xuân bên nhau
5.	Mừng xuân Di-lặc bình an
6.	Ngày xuân đi chùa
7.	Tết tết đến, tết tết về
8.	Tình xuân
9.	Xuân đã về
10.	Xuân sum vầy

X. NHẠC LỄ CƯỚI
1.	Cầu nguyện hôn lễ
2.	Câu thề sắc son
3.	Chúc mừng hôn lễ
4.	Có gì vui bằng
5.	Con cảm ơn Phật
6.	Cùng chung con đường
7.	Dâng lễ trầu cau
8.	Định nghĩa chữ yêu
9.	Duyên nợ trầu cau
10.	Hạnh phúc hòa thuận
11.	Hạnh phúc nhân đôi
12.	Khi Phật bên ta
13.	Lương duyên
14.	Phật từ bi
15.	Quỳ dưới Phật đài
16.	Tay trao nhẫn cưới
17.	Tình nghĩa trăm năm
18.	Trao nhau nhẫn cưới 
19.	Trọn đời thủy chung
20.	Vòng nhẫn cưới

XI. NHẠC LỄ TANG
1. Cát bụi phù du
2. Chết không mất hẳn
3. Cực lạc siêu sinh
4. Cực lạc Tây phương
5. Kiếp sống vô thường
6. Kiếp sống vô thường
7. Lời mẹ dặn lúc vô thường
8. Một mai tôi chết
9. Nghiệp như bóng theo hình
10. Niệm Phật khép lại sầu bi
11. Niệm Phật nhất tâm
12. Niệm Phật vãng sanh
13. Quy luật vô thường
14. Thân là giả tạm
15. Trở về cát bụi
16. Trong kiếp phù du
17. Vĩnh biệt người thân

PHẦN II: NHẠC THIẾU NHI VÀ NHẠC TUỔI TRẺ (156 bài)

NHẠC THIẾU NHI TỔNG QUÁT
1.	Ba con là số một
2.	Ba hãy dậy sớm
3.	Bé chúc ba mẹ ngủ ngon
4.	Cả gia đình đều thương con
5.	Cô giáo của em
6.	Có Phật, đời em nở hoa
7.	Con hứa cha mẹ
8.	Con thương kính ba
9.	Con thương kính mẹ
10.	Công cha nghĩa mẹ
11.	Đêm trung thu
12.	Em đi chùa
13.	Em đi học
14.	Em ghi nhớ công ơn thầy cô
15.	Em học ở trường
16.	Em không ăn vặt
17.	Em không nghiện ngập
18.	Em là búp sen từ bi
19.	Em là con ngoan trò giỏi
20.	Em lễ phép
21.	Em mừng đức Phật đản sinh
22.	Em phải học ôn bài
23.	Em quét nhà
24.	Em tập phẩy tay
25.	Khi cha mẹ đi vắng
26.	Không hút thuốc
27.	Không xả rác
28.	Mẹ là hạnh phúc cùa đời con
29.	Ngày đầu cắp sách đến trường
30.	Như biển rộng suối nguồn
31.	Rước đèn trung thu
32.	Tấm lòng của mẹ

NHẠC THIẾU NHI VÀ TUỔI TRẺ 1
1.	Cảm ơn
2.	Chào hỏi
3.	Đi bộ
4.	Đi học đúng giờ
5.	Em là Phật tử
6.	Em và các bạn
7.	Gia đình em
8.	Gòn gàng, sạch sẽ
9.	Lễ Phật, tụng kinh
10.	Lễ phép với thầy cô giáo
11.	Lễ phép, nhường nhịn
12.	Trong lớp học

NHẠC THIẾU NHI VÀ TUỔI TRẺ 2
1.	Bảo vệ loài vật có ích
2.	Chăm chỉ học tập
3.	Chăm làm việc nhà
4.	Em đi ngủ sớm
5.	Em không mê chơi
6.	Giữ gìn trật tự, vệ sinh
7.	Giúp đỡ bạn bè
8.	Giúp người khuyết tật
9.	Gọn gàng và ngăn nắp
10.	Học tập
11.	Lịch sự khi đến nhà người
12.	Nhận lỗi, xin lỗi
13.	Nói chuyện lịch sự
14.	Nói lời yêu cầu
15.	Trả lại của rơi

NHẠC THIẾU NHI VÀ TUỔI TRẺ 3
1.	Biết ơn những người có công
2.	Chăm sóc cây xanh
3.	Đoàn kết
4.	Em đến chùa sinh hoạt
5.	Em đến chùa sinh hoạt
6.	Lời hứa
7.	Quan tâm giúp đỡ hàng xóm
8.	Quan tâm, chăm sóc người thân
9.	Tiết kiệm nước
10.	Tôn trọng
11.	Tôn trọng đám tang
12.	Tôn trọng khách nước ngoài
13.	Tôn trọng vật riêng tư
14.	Tự làm việc của mình

NHẠC THIẾU NHI VÀ TUỔI TRẺ 4
1.	Bảo vệ môi trường
2.	Bày tỏ ý kiến
3.	Biết ơn thầy cô giáo
4.	Giữ gìn công trình công cộng
5.	Hiếu thảo với ông bà cha mẹ
6.	Lịch sự với mọi người
7.	Tham gia hoạt động nhân đạo
8.	Tiết kiệm thời gian
9.	Tiết kiệm tiền của
10.	Tôn trọng luật giao thông
11.	Tôn trọng người lao động
12.	Trung thực
13.	Vượt khó
14.	Yêu lao động

NHẠC THIẾU NHI VÀ TUỔI TRẺ 5
1.	Bảo vệ tài nguyên thiên nhiên
2.	Em là Phật tử thiếu nhi
3.	Em yêu hòa bình
4.	Em yêu tổ quốc Việt Nam
5.	Hợp tác với mọi người
6.	Kính già yêu trẻ
7.	Nhớ ơn tổ tiên
8.	Phật đản Liên hợp quốc
9.	Tôn trọng phụ nữ
10.	Trách nhiệm với bản thân
11.	Vượt qua khó khăn

NHẠC THIẾU NHI VÀ TUỔI TRẺ 6
1.	An toàn giao thông
2.	Bảo vệ bản thân
3.	Chan hòa
4.	Lễ độ
5.	Lịch sự
6.	Mục đích học
7.	Phật tử tại gia
8.	Quyền được học
9.	Siêng năng và kiên trì
10.	Tích cực và tự giác
11.	Tiết kiệm
12.	Tôn trọng kỷ luật
13.	Tự chăm sóc rèn luyện bản thân
14.	Yêu thiên nhiên

NHẠC THIẾU NHI VÀ TUỔI TRẺ 7
1.	Đoàn kết, giúp đỡ
2.	Gia đình văn hóa
3.	Kế hoạch
4.	Khoan dung, vị tha
5.	Kỷ luật đạo đức
6.	Quyền trẻ em
7.	Sống giản dị
8.	Tôn sư trọng đạo
9.	Trung thực
10.	Truyền thống gia đình
11.	Tự tin
12.	Tự trọng

NHẠC THIẾU NHI VÀ TUỔI TRẺ 8
1.	Gia đình hạnh phúc
2.	Giữ chữ tín
3.	Liêm khiết
4.	Nếp sống chuẩn mực
5.	Nói không với tệ nạn
6.	Pháp luật và kỷ luật
7.	Tham gia việc tốt
8.	Tình bạn trong sáng
9.	Tôn trọng lẽ phải
10.	Tôn trọng người khác
11.	Tộn trọng tài sản
12.	Tôn trọng tôn giáo
13.	Tự do ngôn luận
14.	Tự giác và sáng tạo
15.	Tự lập

NHẠC THIẾU NHI VÀ TUỔI TRẺ 9
1.	Bảo vệ hòa bình
2.	Chất lượng và hiệu quả
3.	Công bằng chính trực
4.	Dân chủ và hòa hợp
5.	Em chia sẻ lời Phật
6.	Em giúp mọi người hiểu Phật pháp
7.	Hôn nhân
8.	Hôn nhân hạnh phúc
9.	Hợp tác
10.	Hợp tác phát triển
11.	Lao động chân chính
12.	Năng động sáng tạo
13.	Nghề nghiệp chân chính
14.	Tôn trọng luật pháp
15.	Truyền thống Việt Nam
16.	Tự chủ
17.	Tuân thủ đạo đức

References

External links 

Pháp thoại của Thầy Thích Nhật Từ
Ven. Nhat Tu's profile (Vài nét về thầy Thích Nhật Từ)
Ven. Nhat Tu's Selected writings on Buddhism Today website (Các tác phẩm của Tỳ Kheo Thích Nhật Từ trên trang Đạo Phật Ngày Nay)
Ven. Nhat Tu's Buddhism Today website (Tỳ Kheo Thích Nhật Từ biên tập trang Đạo Phật Ngày Nay)
Ven. Nhat Tu's Dharma Talks in Vietnamese (Trang Tủ Sách Phật Học: Đại Tạng Kinh Việt Nam và pháp thoại MP3của Tỳ kheo Thích Nhật Từ biên tập)
Ven. Nhat Tu's on http://quangduc.com (Tỳ Kheo Thích Nhật Từ trên trang Quảng Đức)

1969 births
Living people
21st-century Buddhist monks
Buddhist pacifists
Scholars of Buddhism
Buddhist translators
People from Ho Chi Minh City
Nonviolence advocates
Thiền Buddhists
Vietnamese academics
Vietnamese Buddhist missionaries
Vietnamese Buddhist monks
20th-century Buddhist monks
Vietnamese pacifists
Vietnamese translators
Vietnamese Zen Buddhists
Zen Buddhist monks
Missionary linguists